Peronosclerospora miscanthi is a plant pathogen infecting sugarcanes.

References

External links

Water mould plant pathogens and diseases
Sugarcane diseases
Peronosporales